Patrick John Ryan (20 April 1950 – 5 March 1985) was a New Zealand rugby union player. A loose forward, Ryan represented Bush, Wairarapa Bush, and Hawke's Bay at a provincial level. He was a member of the New Zealand national side, the All Blacks, on the 1976 tour of South America, playing in five matches but no full internationals.

Ryan was described as "never far from the ball, extremely fit, a grand forward with the ball in hand, a fine cover defender and tackler".

He died of cancer in 1985 and was buried in Taupo Public Cemetery.

His father, Bill, played for Wairarapa Bush between 1948 and 1952.

References

1950 births
1985 deaths
People educated at St. Patrick's College, Silverstream
New Zealand rugby union players
New Zealand international rugby union players
Bush rugby union players
Wairarapa Bush rugby union players
Hawke's Bay rugby union players
Deaths from cancer in New Zealand
Burials at Taupo Public Cemetery
People from Pahiatua
Rugby union players from Manawatū-Whanganui